Hadid is an Arabic given name literally meaning "iron"; Hadid and Al-Hadid are also Arabic surnames. Hadid may refer to:

 Mohamed Hadid, Palestinian-American real estate developer
 Mohammed Hadid, Iraqi-British politician and father of Foulath Hadid and Zaha Hadid
 Foulath Hadid, Iraqi writer, accountant and expert on Arab affairs
 Zaha Hadid, Iraqi-British architect
 Gigi Hadid, model
 Bella Hadid, model
 Tala Hadid, American film director and daughter of Foulath Hadid
 Yolanda Hadid, Dutch American television personality and former model
 Izz bin Hibat Allah Al Hadid, 13th-century Islamic scholar
 Diana al-Hadid, Syrian American artist
 Fahad Hadeed, Emirati footballer

Hadid is also part of a patronymic name. When Hadid appeared after the proper name (in Arabic: ism), it usually meant the "son of Hadid", although in modern times the omission of  Al makes the patronymic mixed up with the surname:

 Ahmed Hadid Al Mukhaini, Omani football player
 Osama Hadid Al-Mukhaini, Omani football player

See also
Haddad
Hadidi (disambiguation)

Arabic-language surnames
Arabic masculine given names